Miltzow is a village and a former municipality in the Vorpommern-Rügen district, in Mecklenburg-Vorpommern, Germany. Since 7 June 2009, it is part of the Sundhagen municipality.

Transport

Miltzow railway station connects Miltzow with Stralsund, Greifswald, Züssow, Usedom, Angermünde, Eberswalde and Berlin.

Villages in Mecklenburg-Western Pomerania